Holt Glacier is a broad glacier on Bear Peninsula that flows east to the sea between Grimes Ridge and the Jones Bluffs in Marie Byrd Land, Antarctica. It was first delineated by the United States Geological Survey from air photos taken by U.S. Navy Operation Highjump in January 1947, and was named by the Advisory Committee on Antarctic Names after Joseph V. Holt, a member of the U.S. Army Aviation Detachment in Antarctica, 1965–66. Webster Pass divides Brush Glacier from Holt Glacier.

See also
Wright Pass

References

Glaciers of Marie Byrd Land